Falko Götz (born 26 March 1962) is a German football manager and former player.

Playing career
Götz began playing football for  FC Vorwärts Berlin in 1969. He joined the youth department of BFC Dynamo two years later. However, Götz was not allowed  to attend an elite Children and Youth Sports School (KJS), where talents of BFC Dynamo were normally enrolled. The problem was allegedly that he had family members in West Germany and therefore West German affiliation. But his talent could not be ignored. Götz rose through the youth academy of BFC Dynamo and made his professional debut for the BFC Dynamo in the 1979-80 season at the age of 17. Götz would come to win several league titles in a row with BFC Dynamo. 

The day before a European Cup match against Partizan Belgrade in 1983, he escaped and defected to West Germany along with teammate Dirk Schegel. BFC Dynamo refused to allow him to cancel his contract, and on this technicality he was banned from playing professional football by FIFA for one year, but was able to stay in the West Germany. Götz joined Bayer Leverkusen, where he stayed for five years and won the UEFA Cup in 1988. He scored in the second leg of the final against Espanyol, one of three goals needed to equal a 3–0 deficit. Bayer Leverkusen eventually went on to win the game on penalties. He soon moved on to 1. FC Köln and had spells with Galatasaray (1992–1994), 1. FC Saarbrücken (1994–1995) and Hertha BSC (1995–1997) before retiring as a football player. Götz then took up the role as manager of the reserve team of Hertha BSC, the Hertha BSC II.

Coaching career
Götz started his coaching career at Hertha BSC II. He was briefly Hertha's caretaker manager during 2002, and was re-appointed as full-time manager in 2004, having managed 1860 München the previous season. Götz was sacked by Hertha on 10 April 2007. On 15 December 2008, Holstein Kiel announced Götz as head coach of the club and would take over during the winter break. Götz was dismissed on 17 September 2009.

In 2011, Götz was appointed as head coach of Vietnam. After some positive games in national-level team, however their under-23 team disappointed, and he was fired on 23 December 2011, just six months after taking charge.

On 29 April 2013, he was appointed as coach of Erzgebirge Aue. He was sacked on 2 September 2014.

He was hired by FSV Frankfurt on 11 April 2016.

Career statistics

Honours
BFC Dynamo
 DDR Oberliga: 1980–81, 1981–82, 1982–83

BFC Dynamo also won the DDR-Oberliga title in 1984, but Götz had defected half-way through the season.

Bayer Leverkusen
UEFA Cup: 1987–88

Galatasaray
Turkish Super League: 1992–93, 1993–94
Turkish Cup: 1992–93

See also
List of Eastern Bloc defectors

References

External links

1962 births
Living people
People from Rodewisch
People from Bezirk Karl-Marx-Stadt
German football managers
German footballers
Footballers from Saxony
East Germany under-21 international footballers
East German footballers
German expatriate footballers
Berliner FC Dynamo players
Bayer 04 Leverkusen players
Galatasaray S.K. footballers
Hertha BSC players
1. FC Köln players
Association football defenders
1. FC Saarbrücken players
TSV 1860 Munich managers
East German defectors
Hertha BSC managers
FSV Frankfurt managers
FC Erzgebirge Aue managers
Bundesliga managers
Bundesliga players
2. Bundesliga players
Süper Lig players
Expatriate footballers in Turkey
Expatriate footballers in Vietnam
Holstein Kiel managers
Vietnam national football team managers
Expatriate football managers in Vietnam
2. Bundesliga managers
3. Liga managers
German expatriate sportspeople in Turkey
German expatriate sportspeople in Vietnam
DDR-Oberliga players
UEFA Cup winning players
East German emigrants to West Germany